The Glory satellite was a planned NASA satellite mission that would have collected data on the chemical, micro-physical and optical properties—and the spatial and temporal distributions—of sulfate and other aerosols, and would have collected solar irradiance data for the long-term climate record. The science focus areas served by Glory included: atmospheric composition; carbon cycle, ecosystems, and biogeochemistry; climate variability and change; and water and energy cycles. The US$424 million satellite was lost on 4 March 2011, when its Taurus XL carrier rocket malfunctioned. A subsequent investigation revealed that the fairing system failed to open fully, causing the satellite to reenter the atmosphere at which point it likely broke up and burned. NASA investigators later determined the cause for the launch failure to be faulty materials provided by aluminum manufacturer Sapa Profiles.

Spacecraft
The Glory spacecraft bus uses Orbital Science Corporation's LEOStar bus design, with twin articulated deployable solar panels, 3-axis stabilization, and X-band and S-band RF communications capabilities. The structure consists of an octagonal aluminium space frame and a hydrazine propulsion module containing enough fuel for at least 36 months of on-orbit service. The spacecraft bus also provides payload power; command, telemetry, and science data interfaces, including onboard storage of data; and an attitude control subsystem to support instrument pointing requirements.

Launch
The launch from Vandenberg Air Force Base, near Lompoc, California, aboard a Taurus XL rocket was originally planned for 23 February 2011. It was postponed due to a malfunction in ground support equipment. The next liftoff attempt was 4 March 2011. The Taurus rocket also carried three small CubeSat satellites built by university students in Montana, Colorado and Kentucky, the NASA ELaNa I manifest.

The launch took place on 4 March 2011, at 02:09:43 Pacific Standard Time (10:09:43 UTC) from Vandenberg Air Force Base. The Taurus XL rocket's first three stages functioned as planned, but the nose cone (also known as the payload fairing) failed to separate 2 minutes 58 seconds after the launch. The nose cone covers and protects the satellite during launch and ascent, and is designed to separate and fall away shortly after the launch. Due to the failure of the nose cone to separate, the rocket remained too heavy to reach the correct orbit. According to launch director Omar Baez, the satellite and launcher likely crashed in the southern Pacific Ocean. The failure was estimated to have cost at least $424 million. This only includes the cost of the satellite itself, and not the cost of the launcher and launch services. During the previous failed Taurus XL launch, the vehicle and services were estimated to have cost $54 million.

The previous Taurus XL launch with the Orbiting Carbon Observatory (OCO) in February 2009 also ended in a failure due to failed payload fairing separation. Following the failed OCO mission, Taurus XL launches were put on hold for two years as the rocket's manufacturer Orbital Sciences Corporation tried to fix the payload fairing separation problem, obviously without success. A British OCO scientist said the loss of Glory was a great blow to the NASA Earth science program, especially since the reason for the launch failure was the same as with OCO.

During a news conference shortly after the launch, Rich Straka from Orbital Sciences Corporation said his company was investigating the failure, noting, "there really isn't enough data to say anything more than the fairing didn't separate."

Scientific instruments

NASA Investigation
In 2019 it was announced that NASA Launch Services Program (LSP) investigators have determined the technical root cause for the Taurus XL launch failures of NASA's Orbiting Carbon Observatory (OCO) and Glory missions in 2009 and 2011, respectively: faulty materials provided by aluminium manufacturer, Sapa Profiles, Inc. (SPI). LSP's technical investigation led to the involvement of NASA's Office of the Inspector General and the U.S. Department of Justice (DOJ). The efforts of the DOJ, recently made public, resulted in the resolution of criminal charges and alleged civil claims against SPI, and its agreement to pay US$46 million to the U.S. government and other commercial customers. This relates to a 19-year scheme that included falsifying thousands of certifications for aluminium extrusions to hundreds of customers.

On 24 February 2009, a Taurus XL rocket (Taurus T8) carrying NASA's Orbiting Carbon Observatory (OCO) satellite failed to reach orbit. The Taurus T8 mission failed because the payload fairing did not separate during ascent, causing the rocket to not shed weight. As a result of the extra weight, the Taurus rocket failed to reach orbital velocity, resulting in a total loss of the mission. On 4 March 2011, another Taurus rocket (Taurus T9) carrying NASA's Glory scientific satellite failed to reach orbit. The Taurus T9 mission also concluded in a failure of the payload fairing to separate. The Taurus T8 and T9 missions both reentered earth's atmosphere resulting in break-up and/or burnup of the rocket and satellite, and any surviving pieces would have been dispersed in the Pacific Ocean near Antarctica. The combined cost of both mission failures was in excess of $700 million. This document's purpose is to provide a top-level outline of NASA's updated findings pertaining to the cause of both mishaps.

The Taurus T8 and T9 rockets both used 63-inch diameter payload fairings to cover and protect the spacecraft during ground operations and launch. The payload fairing halves are structurally joined and attached to the rocket using frangible joints. A frangible joint is a structural separation system that is initiated using ordnance. Initiation of the ordnance causes the ligament of the frangible joint extrusion to fracture, allowing the two payload fairing halves to be separated and subsequently jettisoned from the Taurus rocket. The frangible joints for T8 and T9 were made and assembled together, at the same time. The T8 and T9 frangible joint extrusions were manufactured by Sapa Profiles, Inc. (SPI) in its Technical Dynamics Aluminum (TDA) plant, in Portland, Oregon.

References

External links

 Official Site
 Glory.gsfc.nasa.gov Official Site (archived)
 
 

NASA satellites
Satellite launch failures
Spacecraft launched in 2011